Clarissa is a female given name borrowed from Latin, Italian, and Portuguese, originally denoting a nun of the Roman Catholic Order of St. Clare. Clarice is an anglicization of Clarisse, the French form of the same name. Clarisa is the Spanish form of the name, and Klárisza the Hungarian. The given names Clara, Clare, and Claire are all cognates, as are the surnames Sinclair and St. Clair.

Notable people
 Clara Barton (Clarissa Harlowe Barton, 1821–1912), American humanitarian who founded the American Red Cross
  Clarissa Davis (born 1967), American coach and women's basketball hall-of-famer
 Clarissa Dickson Wright (1947–2014), English celebrity chef
 Clarissa F. Dye (1832-1921), Civil War nurse from Philadelphia
 Clarissa Eden, Countess of Avon (1920–2021)
 Clarissa Pinkola Estés (born 1945), American poet
 Clarissa Caldwell Lathrop (1847-1892), American social reformer, autobiographer
 Clarissa Kaye (1931-1994), Australian stage, film and television actress
 Clarissa Ward (born 1980), British-American television journalist
 Clarissa Stadler (born 1966), Austrian journalist, moderator and writer
 Clarissa Pinkola Estés (born 1945), American writer and Jungian psychoanalyst

Fictional characters
 Clarissa Explains It All, a children's TV show in the 1990s
 Clarissa Dalloway in Mrs Dalloway, a 1925 novel by Virginia Woolf
 Clarissa "Clary" Fray in The Mortal Instruments novel series
 Clarissa Harlowe, the heroine of Samuel Richardson's 1748 tragic epistolary novel Clarissa, or, the History of a Young Lady
 Clarissa Hailsham-Brown in Spider's Web, a 1954 play by Agatha Christie
 Clarissa Mellon in Enduring Love, a 1997 novel by Ian McEwan
 Clarissa Saunders in Mr. Smith Goes to Washington, a 1939 film

See also
 Clarissa (disambiguation)
 Poor Clares, nuns of the Order of St Clare, also called the Clarissas or Clarisses
 Claire (given name)
 Clara (given name)
 Clare (given name)
 Clarice

References 

English feminine given names